Hechtia sphaeroblasta is a species of bromeliad plant that is endemic to Mexico. They have pale to yellowish green leaves that show a red blush around each peripheral spine.

References

External links
 Photographed at Chazumba, Oaxaca, by Art Vogel

sphaeroblasta
Flora of Mexico